The 1973 Furman Paladins football team was an American football team that represented Furman University as a member of the Southern Conference (SoCon) during the 1973 NCAA Division I football season. In their first season under head coach Art Baker, Furman compiled a 7–4 record, with a mark of 3–3 in conference play, placing tied for fourth in the SoCon.

Schedule

References

Furman
Furman Paladins football seasons
Furman Paladins football